Rythmetic is a 1956 Canadian short animated film directed by Norman McLaren and Evelyn Lambart for the National Film Board of Canada.

It is an amusing, non-verbal lecture on the subject of mathematics and one of McLaren’s longest animated works.

McLaren wanted to make a truly international film about the inadequacies of communication between peoples of different cultures and languages. To this end, he used the most understood method of communication, Arabic numerals.
 
Filmed without a camera or microphone and using McLaren’s scratch sound system, the film is a ‘crazy dance’ of mechanical actions and anthropomorphic gestures made by arithmetical figures and symbols; we hear rhythmic music with clicks or scratching sounds made by ink directly painted on the soundtrack. The filling of the background with bright figures against a dark background evoke a classroom blackboard and the teaching process. Classified as an educational film, it is also regarded as a visual and auditory work of art.

Awards
 6th Berlin International Film Festival, Berlin: Silver Bear, Short Films, 1956
 Edinburgh International Film Festival, Edinburgh: Diploma of Merit, 1956
 Rapallo International Film Festival, Rapallo, Italy: First Prize, Abstract Films, 1957
 International Review of Specialized Cinematography, Rome: Diploma of Honour, 1957
 Chicago Festival of Contemporary Arts, University of Illinois Chicago: First Prize 1957
 Golden Reel International Film Festival, Film Council of America, New York: Silver Reel Award, Avant-Garde and Experimental, 1957
 Durban International Film Festival, Durban: Certificate of Merit, 1957
 Johannesburg International Film Festival, Johannesburg: Certificate of Merit, 1957

References

External links

1956 films
1956 animated films
1950s animated short films
Canadian animated short films
Animated films without speech
Films directed by Norman McLaren
National Film Board of Canada animated short films
1950s Canadian films